"Torre De Babel" is the fifth single released on May 26, 2006 from David Bisbal's studio album, Premonición. The remix version features reggaeton duo Wisin & Yandel also included on the album.

The song was covered by Serbian singer Jelena Karleuša for her 2008 album JK Revolution, and Greek singer Kostas Martakis for his 2008 album Anatropi.

Track listing
CD Single
 Torre De Babel (Reggaeton Mix) (with Vicente Amigo and Wisin & Yandel) [4:17]
 Torre De Babel (db Original Mix) [3:09]
 Torre De Babel (Wisin & yandel Remix) [4:19]

Charts

References

David Bisbal songs
Wisin & Yandel songs
Spanish-language songs
2007 singles
Songs written by Kike Santander
Universal Music Latino singles
2006 songs
Song recordings produced by Kike Santander